Frédéric Dieudonné (born September 21, 1969) is a French writer, a filmmaker and a producer, environmentalist and creator of the Jules Verne International Film Festival.

Education and early career
In 1986, Dieudonné graduated from highschool and earned his Baccalauréat in Literature and Foreign Languages, with honors, at the age of 16. He then was admitted at the Lycée Janson de Sailly of Paris where he prepared for competitive entrance exams (Classe préparatoire aux grandes écoles) to L'École Normale Supérieure de la rue d'Ulm (Hypokhâgne and Khâgne). After earning a master's degree in Modern Literature, with honors, from the prestigious Sorbonne University of Paris in 1991, he founded the nonprofit Jules Verne Adventures the same year, along with Jean-Christophe Jeauffre. Dedicated to exploration, environment, filmmaking and education, the organization is now based both in Paris and in Los Angeles.
In 1992, Dieudonné and Jeauffre launched the annual Paris Jules Verne Festival, inaugurated by Jacques-Yves Cousteau. This event, now also based in Los Angeles, is dedicated to exploration, education and conservation. Then they developed a production unit to create new adventure & exploration programs for television. The Jules Verne Festival is held each year in April at the Grand Rex theatre of Paris, Europe's largest movie theatre, where it attracts more than 35,000 visitors and guests.

Career
 Filmmaking
From 1999 on, Dieudonné co-produced several films for TV via Jules Verne Adventures, including Devil's Islands and Red and White. A five-month expedition on the Atlantic aboard the tall ship Belem led to his production of the highly acclaimed and award-winning documentaries:
 Whales of Atlantis
 Amazon Trek (2008 Best Feature Documentary Award, White Sands International Film Festival, New Mexico)
 100 Years Under the Sea
 Five Months on the Sea – the Jules Verne Expedition.
Two fully illustrated books were also published after the expedition ( and ).

In 2006, Dieudonné wrote, directed and co-produced the Jules Verne Adventures TV documentary Explorers: From the Titanic to the Moon, starring producer/director James Cameron and veteran Apollo 11 astronaut Buzz Aldrin.
All of the aforementioned films are now being distributed in the US on DVD and Blu-ray with narrations by Sir Christopher Lee and Ernest Borgnine.

The latest expedition he produced for the Mars Institute and NASA is the Northwest Passage Drive (2009–2010): the first motorized crossing of the Arctic Sea. As an executive producer and a consultant, Dieudonné is currently developing both a feature documentary called Passage to Mars and a Science Fiction feature film to be produced in Hollywood.

In 2014, Dieudonné was elected a Fellow of the famed Explorers Club, based in New York City.

 Festivals and special events
In 2005 Dieudonné and Jean-Christophe Jeauffre founded the American version of the French nonprofit Jules Verne Adventures. It is based in Downtown Los Angeles and maintains an IRS 501(c)3 status. The inaugural American launch of the Los Angeles Jules Verne Festival (October 2006 at the Shrine Auditorium) has celebrated the work of George Lucas, Harrison Ford, Dr. Jane Goodall and James Cameron and attracted 6,300 attendees.

The Jules Verne Festival traditionally includes an awards ceremony during which selected explorers, environmentalists, filmmakers and movie stars are presented with the Jules Verne Award. Among others, the Jules Verne Award was given to Gérard Depardieu, Catherine Deneuve, Jean-Pierre Jeunet, Charlotte Rampling, Claude Lelouch, Johnny Depp, Christopher Lee, Patrick Stewart, Mark Hamill, Buzz Aldrin, William Shatner, Tippi Hedren, Stan Lee, Ray Bradbury, Ted Turner, Richard Dean Anderson, Larry Hagman, Christopher Reeve, Roy E. Disney, Tony Curtis, Ernest Borgnine, Steve McQueen, TV series Heroes, Lost, Stargate SG1 and Battlestar Galactica cast and crew, and has celebrated movie classics such as Blade Runner, Star Trek, Superman, Forbidden Planet, Alfred Hitchcock's The Birds, 2001: A Space Odyssey, Planet of the Apes, Some Like It Hot and The Wild Bunch.

References

External links 
  
  Jules Verne Adventures

1969 births
Living people
French film directors
French male writers